Johnathan Charles Francke (born 17 May 1986) is a South African rugby union player for  in the Currie Cup and in the Rugby Challenge. His regular position is outside centre.

Career

Youth and Varsity rugby
In 2007, Francke played for the  team. He was then included in the  Varsity Cup squads in 2008 (without making an appearance), 2009 (where he made one start in their match against the ) and 2010, when he established himself as a first team player, making seven appearances and scoring two tries.

Boland Cavaliers
Francke then joined Wellington-based side . His first class debut came during their 2011 Vodacom Cup match against  in Bredasdorp, also scoring a try a mere seven minutes after coming on. Four more tries followed in six appearances for the remainder of that competition.

He made several more appearances for them in both the Vodacom Cup and Currie Cup competitions in 2012 and 2013, amassing over fifty appearances for the team.

Griquas
Francke signed a deal with Kimberley-based outfit  for 2014.

In July 2014, Francke extended his contract until the end of 2016.

References

South African rugby union players
Living people
1986 births
People from Strand, Western Cape
Boland Cavaliers players
Griquas (rugby union) players
Falcons (rugby union) players
Rugby union centres
Rugby union players from the Western Cape